Nicolò Tresoldi (born 20 August 2004) is a professional footballer who plays for  Hannover 96 as a centre-forward. Born in Italy, he represents Germany at youth international level.

Club career
Born in Cagliari, Tresoldi later settled with his family in Gubbio, where he started playing both football and tennis before choosing to focus on the former sport.

After being offered trials at several high-profile Italian clubs, in 2017 Tresoldi moved with his family to Hanover, Germany, where he proceeded to join the youth sector of Hannover 96. Having impressed during his stints for the under-17 and under-19 teams, on 5 January 2022 the striker signed his first professional contract with the club, with the deal set to be officially activated on the player's eighteenth birthday.

After featuring for Hannover's reserve team towards the end of the 2021–22 season, Tresoldi made his professional debut for Hannover 96 in the 2. Bundesliga on 15 July 2022, against 1. FC Kaiserslautern, coming on as a substitute for Maximilian Beier in the 88th minute; the match eventually ended in a 1–2 away loss for his side.

International career
Thanks to his dual citizenship, Tresoldi can choose to represent either Italy or Germany in international matches.

On 25 October 2022, he made his debut for the German under-19 national team in a 0–1 friendly match loss against Spain.

Personal life
Tresoldi is the son of Italian former professional footballer .

He is fluent in four languages: Italian, German, English and Spanish.

References

External links
 
 
 
 
 

2004 births
Living people
People from Cagliari
Footballers from Sardinia
German footballers
Germany youth international footballers
Italian emigrants to Germany
Naturalized citizens of Germany
German sportspeople of Italian descent
Association football forwards
Hannover 96 II players
Hannover 96 players
2. Bundesliga players
Regionalliga players

Italian footballers